Real Tamale United, often abbreviated as RTU, is a football club based in Tamale, Northern Region of Ghana. The team previously competed in the Ghana Division One  League, after being relegated to the second tier in the 2013–14 Ghana Football Leagues Division One League. In 2021, RTU sealed promotion back to the Ghana Premier League after beating Unity FC 2 - 0 on the last day of the Division One League Season. Their home stadium is 21,000 Seater Capacity Aliu Mahama Sports Stadium in Tamale. They relocated to their current grounds from the Kaladan Park after the 2008 African Cup of Nations.

History
The club was founded in 1976 by the first chairman Alhaji Adam.H (Progress).

Support

Rivalries 
Real Tamale United has rivalries with Steadfast FC, Tamale City FC. All three clubs are located in Tamale, Ghana, therefore causing an interesting and fierce rivalry amongst one another.

Achievements
Ghana Telecom Gala: 1
 1997–98
GN Bank Division One League: 1
 2015–16

Performance in CAF competitions
CAF Cup: 3 appearances
1992 – First Round
1996 – disqualified in First Round
1998 – First Round

Current squad
As of 14 October 2022.

Management

Previous players 

 Category:Real Tamale United players

References

External links
Club information

Tamale, Ghana
Football clubs in Ghana
Association football clubs established in 1976
1976 establishments in Ghana
Sports clubs in Ghana
Dagbon
Football clubs in Tamale
Real Tamale United